Supper is the tenth studio album by Smog. It was released in 2003 in Europe by Domino Recording Company and in North America by Drag City.

Critical reception

At Metacritic, which assigns a weighted average score out of 100 to reviews from mainstream critics, the album received an average score of 79, based on 15 reviews, indicating "generally favorable reviews".

No Ripcord placed it at number 39 on the "Top 50 Albums of 2003" list.

Track listing

Personnel
Credits adapted from liner notes.

 Bill Callahan – vocals, guitar, Hammond organ, piano, production
 Sarabeth Tucek – vocals
 Andy Hopkins – guitar
 Bill Lowman – guitar (8), banjo (8)
 Ken Champion – pedal steel guitar, piano
 Ryan Hembrey – bass guitar, cello
 Nate Lepine – wind controller
 Jim White – drums
 Rian Murphy – drums (3)
 Jeremy Lemos – recording
 Nick Webb – mastering

References

External links
 

2003 albums
Bill Callahan (musician) albums
Drag City (record label) albums
Domino Recording Company albums